The following is a comparative list of smartphones belonging to the bq line of devices, using the Android/Ubuntu operating system.

Smartphones
Android (operating system) devices
Lists of mobile phones
Computing comparisons
BQ (company) mobile phones